The 1962 Auburn Tigers football team represented Auburn University in the 1962 NCAA University Division football season. It was the Tigers' 71st overall and 29th season as a member of the Southeastern Conference (SEC). The team was led by head coach Ralph "Shug" Jordan, in his 12th year, and played their home games at Cliff Hare Stadium in Auburn and Legion Field in Birmingham, Alabama. They finished with a record of six wins, three losses and one tie (6–3–1 overall, 4–3 in the SEC).

Schedule

Roster
QB Jimmy Sidle

References

Auburn
Auburn Tigers football seasons
Auburn Tigers football